Netechma splendida is a species of moth of the family Tortricidae. It is found in Carchi Province, Ecuador.

The wingspan is 23–26 mm. The ground colour of the forewings is glossy whitish, edged with yellow in the form of a series of rounded spots. The remaining area is dark brown with scattered yellow dots. The hindwings are grey cream, mixed with brownish in the apical part.

Etymology
The species name refers to the splendid colouration of the species.

References

Moths described in 2008
Netechma